American businessman and philanthropist James Herbert Dahl (born August 16, 1953) is the founder and former chairman of Rock Creek Capital, a Jacksonville, Florida-based firm that provides investment services centered on acquiring and managing land in an environmentally responsible manner. He served two four-year terms as a member of the Investment Advisory Council for the State of Florida's Pension Fund - the nation's fourth-largest pension fund—beginning in 2001.  He was chairman of the council from 2005-06.  He previously managed the Convertible Bond Department of investment bank Drexel Burnham Lambert, where he provided testimony against Michael Milken.  Dahl was never charged with any wrongdoing.

Biography
Dahl was born in Minneapolis but raised primarily in Miami and Naples, Florida.  He received his bachelor's degree in finance and real estate from Florida State University (with honors) and earned an MBA from Florida State’s Graduate School of Business in 1975.

From 1981 to 1989, he served as executive vice president of investment bank Drexel Burnham Lambert, where he held the post of senior vice president and managed the Convertible Bond Department, under the direction of Michael Milken. He was described by The New York Times as a " Classic 1980's mover and shaker... Once a star salesman for Michael R. Milken's junk-bond operations, he later received immunity for testifying against him."  Dahl was granted criminal immunity, in exchange for his testimony before a Grand Jury in October, 1988.   Milken was indicted for stock manipulation in March, 1989. He was eventually convicted, and served a 22-month prison sentence; the company declared bankruptcy on February 14, 1990.

After Drexel, Dahl  founded Rock Creek Capital and its affiliated entities in 1989, serving as chairman until 2009, when he was succeeded by real estate magnate John C. Cushman, III.  In 1994, Dahl co-founded Timbervest, LLC, a timberland investment organization that managed over $500 million in assets prior to its sale in 2004.

He is married to the former Kathleen Mary Rainey and has five children.

Philanthropy
A longtime philanthropist, Dahl created The Dahl Family Foundation in 2003 as a vehicle for his contributions to support higher education and   opportunities for children, in particular The Emily Krzyzewski Center (The Emily K Center) and has given to Wolfson’s Children’s Hospital, Duke University, Florida State University, The Bolles School, Maclay School, The Guardian of Dreams Foundation, United Way and the American Cancer Society.

He is also actively involved in environmental conservation and preservation.  He is a supporter of Tall Timbers and other land conservation groups, and has donated conservation easements on many of his properties.

References

External links
  Rock Creek Capital Website, James H. Dahl, Partner, Biography
  The Emily Krzyzewski Center

1953 births
Living people
American real estate businesspeople
American philanthropists
Florida State University alumni
Businesspeople from Miami
Businesspeople from Minneapolis
People from Naples, Florida